Lionel Tollemache, 5th Earl of Dysart (6 August 1734 – 20 February 1799) was a Scottish nobleman, styled Lord Huntingtower from birth until his succession to the Dysart earldom in 1770.

Lord Huntingtower received no settlement from his father at his majority, and, feeling he owed him nothing, married without his knowledge or consent. The bride was Charlotte, daughter of Sir Edward Walpole, whom he married on 2 October 1760 at St James's Church, Piccadilly. Charlotte's uncle Horace Walpole called Huntingtower "a very handsome person". He succeeded to the earldom a decade later.

Charlotte died, after a long and painful illness, at Ham House on 5 September 1789. Dysart remarried, on 19 April 1791, to Magdalene Lewis, sister of his brother Wilbraham's wife. He had no children by either wife, and upon his death at Ham House in 1799 was succeeded by his brother Wilbraham.

References

Attribution

External links
Dysart, Earl of (S, 1643) Cracroft's Peerage
Ham House homepage

1734 births
1799 deaths
Earls of Dysart
People from Ham, London
Lionel Tollemache, 5th Earl Dysart